Manoj Tiwari is an Indian film director, known for his work in Bollywood. He is known for his movie Global Baba and P Se Pyaar F Se Faraar. He made his directorial debut with Hello Darling (2010).

Career
He made his debut as a director with Hello Darling (2010). With this, Tiwari became Subhash Ghai's first assistant to direct a movie produced by his (Mukta arts).

Khwaabon Ke Darmiyaan, a TV show he directed, was awarded the ‘Best International Show’ at the Zee Rishtey Awards 2016 aired on February 19, 2017.

Filmography

References

Living people
1967 births
21st-century Indian film directors
Film directors from Mumbai
Hindi-language film directors